Alfred Walter "Fuzz" Crompton (born 21 February 1927 in Durban) is a South African paleontologist and zoologist.

Crompton studied at the University of Stellenbosch and obtained a bachelor's degree in 1947 and a masters in 1949, in zoology. He completed his PhD at Cambridge University in 1953.

From 1954 to 1956 Crompton curated the national paleontological museum at Bloemfontein, and from 1956 to 1964 directed the South African Museum in Cape Town, where he also lectured at the university. From 1964 to 1970 he was a professor of biology and geology at Yale University, and then from 1970 to 1976 he directed the Peabody Museum of Natural History. From 1970 to 1982 he directed the Museum of Comparative Zoology at Harvard, and from 1970 until 1985 was a professor at Harvard University (Alexander Agassiz Professor of Zoology). Between 1985 and 2005 Crompton was named the emeritus Fisher Professor of Natural History.

In 1976/77 and 1983/64 Crompton was a Guggenheim Fellow. He is a Fellow in the American Academy of Arts and Sciences (1969) and the American Association for the Advancement of Science. In 2011 he received the Romer-Simpson-Medal.

External links 
 Homepage

References 

1927 births
South African paleontologists
Harvard University faculty
South African zoologists
Fellows of the American Academy of Arts and Sciences
Fellows of the American Association for the Advancement of Science
Living people
South African expatriates in the United Kingdom
South African expatriates in the United States